Elmer Ellsworth Knetzer (July 22, 1885 – October 3, 1975) was a professional baseball player who played pitcher in the Major Leagues from 1909 to 1917. He played for the Brooklyn Dodgers, Pittsburgh Rebels, Boston Braves, and Cincinnati Reds.

External links

 Interview with baseball player Elmer Knetzer (sound recording) by Eugene C. Murdock on Jan. 24, 1975, in Pittsburgh, Pa. (2 hr.). Available on Cleveland Public Library's Digital Gallery.

1885 births
1975 deaths
Major League Baseball pitchers
Baseball players from Pennsylvania
Brooklyn Dodgers players
Brooklyn Superbas players
Pittsburgh Rebels players
Boston Braves players
Cincinnati Reds players
Lawrence Colts players
Columbus Senators players